Kyle Edmund and Cameron Norrie were the defending champions, but chose not to participate this year.

Jérémy Chardy and Fabrice Martin won the title, defeating Luke Bambridge and Jonny O'Mara in the final, 7–5, 7–6(7–3).

Seeds

Draw

Draw

References

External links
 Main Draw

Doubles